Chomana Dudi (Choma's Drum) is a feature film in the Kannada language. It is based on a novel of the same name, written by Shivaram Karanth. The film was released in the year 1975 and won the Swarna Kamal, India's National Award for the best film. This was also the first Kannada movie to feature a reference to the demigod Panjurli.

Plot
Choma is an untouchable bonded-labourer in a village who is working along with his family for a landlord, as he belongs to a backward class. Due to his social status, he is not allowed to till his own land, something that he desires most. Though he managed to rear a pair of bullocks that he found straying in the forest, he cannot use them to till the land. He comes in contact of Christian missionaries who try to convert him giving him the lure of the land, but Choma does not want to let go of his faith. He releases the fury that fate has beset on him, by beating his drum.

He has four sons and a daughter; two of his elder sons work in a distant coffee estate trying to pay off the debt. One of the sons dies of cholera and the other one converts to Christianity by marrying a Christian girl. His daughter, Belli works in the plantation and falls for the charm of Manvela, the estate-owner's writer. She is raped by the estate owner, who then writes off Choma's debt. She returns to Choma's home  telling him of the reality. His youngest son drowns in a river, with nobody coming to save him because of him being an untouchable. He then finds his daughter in an compromising position with Manvela. With anger, he beats her and kicks her out of the house. To defy his fate, he starts tilling a piece of land and then chases off his bullock into the forest. In the climax, Choma shuts himself in his house and starts playing the drum till he dies.

Awards
 National Film Award for Best Feature Film (1976)
 National Film Award for Best Actor - M. V. Vasudeva Rao (1976)
 National Film Award for Best Story – K Shivaram Karanth

Karnataka State Film Awards 1975-76
 First Best Film
 Best Actor – M V Vasudev Rao
 Best Supporting Actress – Padma Kumata
 Best Story Writer – Shivaram Karanth
 Best Screenplay – Shivaram Karanth
 Best Sound Recording – Krishnamurthy

Notes

References

External links
 

1970s Kannada-language films
1975 films
Films featuring a Best Actor National Award-winning performance
Best Feature Film National Film Award winners
Films based on Indian novels
Films whose writer won the Best Story National Film Award
Films scored by B. V. Karanth